Jacopo Majochi (born August 28, 1976) is an Italian sprint canoer who competed in the early 2000s. He finished eighth in the K-1 1000 m event at the 2000 Summer Olympics in Sydney.

References
Sports-Reference.com profile

1976 births
Canoeists at the 2000 Summer Olympics
Italian male canoeists
Living people
Olympic canoeists of Italy
Place of birth missing (living people)
21st-century Italian people